An underground restaurant, sometimes known as a supper club or closed door restaurant, is a social dining restaurant operated out of someone's home, generally bypassing local zoning and health-code regulations. They are usually advertised by word of mouth or unwanted advertising. Websites such as BonAppetour have been created to help people find and book these restaurants.

Depending on the area's law, the establishments may be illegal, even though they have been around for decades. They are becoming increasingly popular in the U.S. and internationally, including Cape Town and the Netherlands, where they are known as 'huiskamer restaurants' ('living room restaurants').

Appeal
The attraction of the underground restaurant for the customer varies. In some cases, it is the opportunity to sample new food, often at low cost outside the traditional restaurant experience; other times, customers are paying a premium price for direct access to some of the top chefs and young talent in a region. Guests of the underground restaurant also cite one of the biggest reasons for enjoying the experience is the social interaction with strangers over food, something which would generally be frowned upon in a traditional restaurant setting. “Every dinner you go to is completely different,” one avid supporter of pop-up restaurants told Cape Town magazine.

Underground restaurants have been described as "anti-restaurants;" though an increasing number of restaurant chefs are stepping out of their kitchens to re-ignite their passion for cooking in non-traditional spaces. For the host, the benefit is to make money and experiment with cooking without being required to invest in restaurant property. "It's literally like playing restaurant," one host told the San Francisco Chronicle, "You can create the event, and then it's over."

History
In 2001 the Pemberton family returned from a vacation in Cuba where they discovered a dining phenomenon. “Casa Particulares”, were where tourists could go to sample ethnic cooking at reasonable prices.  Arguably the very first underground restaurant in the UK and based on the Cuban model, Brovey Lair is situated at the back of the Pemberton's home in Ovington, Norfolk. In 2010 Brovey Lair won The Good Food Guide's Best Fish Restaurant in Britain award and still holds top place as their top rated restaurant in Norfolk.

In 2013 a new kind of underground dining restaurant emerged in Cape Town, South Africa called SecretEATS. Unlike social dining restaurants of the past, the concept brings together top South African chefs, international guest chefs, or young, rising stars with adventurous food and wine lovers in secret, undisclosed locations. Guests request a private invitation to join the members-only dining movement through the web site; invitations are sent based on factors such as interests, geography and special dietary requirements like vegetarians.

Past dinners have taken place inside of an ancient castle, underground wine cellars, private gardens at the foot of Table Mountain, urban, industrial warehouses and stunning, immaculate art galleries. Chefs have included MasterChef SA runner-up Sue-Ann Allen, celebrity chefs Pete Goffe-Wood, Bertus Basson, Neill Anthony and Matt Manning, and some of the country's most beloved restaurant chefs like Brad Ball, Craig Cormack and more.

Founded by former American Express senior manager, Gregory Zeleny, the 'moving restaurant' was started with the goal of bringing people together around the table over food. From there, it evolved with a key focus on the chef and his or her story behind this menu that has just been created for one night only. The focus is on working with chefs committed to using fresh, organic and seasonal ingredients.

Notable places

Argentina
 Casa SaltShaker - Buenos Aires

Australia 

 Black Ox Dining - Brisbane - Style Magazines "Black Ox Dining: The Must-Try Brisbane Degustation Experience"
 Just Sit ~ Secret Supper Club - Brisbane

Canada
 Charlie's Burgers - Toronto - ranked by Food and Wine Magazine as one of the top three "word of mouth" supper clubs on its list of “100 Best New Food and Drink Experiences in the World”.
 No Fixed Address - Vancouver

Hong Kong
 PlateCulture is a new rising trend where you can book dinners at local chefs' private venues

France
 Jim Haynes' Supper Club - Paris - considered the original supper club
 New Friends Table - Paris

Russia 

 PopOver Supper Club - St.Petersburg

South Africa 
 SecretEATS - Cape Town, Johannesburg, Durban, Pretoria
 Slippery Spoon - Cape Town
 Supper Lounge - Cape Town
 [spasie] underground - Cape Town

United States
 Hush - Washington, D.C.
 Midnight Brunch - New York City
 Savor Charleston - Charleston, South Carolina
 The FourCoursemen - Athens, Georgia
 Ghetto Gourmet - New York City
 SubCulture Dining - New York City

See also

Speakeasy
Smokeasy
Guerrilla Gourmet

References

Further reading
 
 

Restaurants by type